This is a list of West Texas A&M Buffaloes football players in the NFL Draft.

Key

Selections

References

West Texas AandM

West Texas A&M Buffaloes